This is a listing of Australian rules footballers who made their senior debut for a Victorian Football League (VFL) club in 1969.

Debuts

References

Australian rules football records and statistics
Australian rules football-related lists
1969 in Australian rules football